The fifth and final season of the American television series Star Trek: Discovery follows the crew of the USS Discovery, more than 900 years after the events of Star Trek: The Original Series, on a galactic adventure to find a mysterious power that has been hidden for centuries and which other dangerous groups are also searching for. The season is produced by CBS Studios in association with Secret Hideout and Roddenberry Entertainment, with Alex Kurtzman and Michelle Paradise serving as showrunners.

Sonequa Martin-Green stars as Michael Burnham, captain of the Discovery, along with the returning Doug Jones, Anthony Rapp, Mary Wiseman, Wilson Cruz, Blu del Barrio, and David Ajala. They are joined by Callum Keith Rennie. Development on the season began by March 2020 so it could be filmed back-to-back with the fourth season, but these plans were altered by the COVID-19 pandemic. The fifth season was officially ordered in January 2022 and filming took place in Toronto, Canada, from June to November. Paramount announced in March 2023 that the season would be the last for the series. Additional filming was planned so the season could better conclude the series.

The season is expected to premiere on the streaming service Paramount+ in early 2024, and run for 10 episodes.

Episodes 

Frequent Star Trek director Jonathan Frakes returned to direct for the season, and Lee Rose directed the fourth episode. The following writers are credited, in episode order, for the 10 episodes: Michelle Paradise; Alan McElroy; Kyle Jarrow & Lauren Wilkinson; Sean Cochran; Johanna Lee & Carlos Cisco; Kenneth Lin & Brandon A. Schultz; M. Raven Metzner; Lauren Wilkinson & Eric J. Robbins; Sean Cochran & Ari Friedman; and Kyle Jarrow & Michelle Paradise.

Cast and characters

Main 
 Sonequa Martin-Green as Michael Burnham
 Doug Jones as Saru
 Anthony Rapp as Paul Stamets
 Mary Wiseman as Sylvia Tilly
 Wilson Cruz as Hugh Culber
 Blu del Barrio as Adira Tal
 David Ajala as Cleveland "Book" Booker
 Callum Keith Rennie as Rayner

Recurring 
 Eve Harlow as Moll
 Elias Toufexis as L'ak

Notable guests 
 Oded Fehr as Charles Vance
 Chelah Horsdal as Laira Rillak
 Tara Rosling as T'Rina
 David Cronenberg as Kovich
 Tig Notaro as Jett Reno

Production

Development 
Development on a fifth season of Star Trek: Discovery had begun by March 2020, when work was taking place on the fourth season, to allow the two seasons to be filmed back-to-back, but these plans were altered by the COVID-19 pandemic. In October, executive producer and co-showrunner Alex Kurtzman said there were "years and years left on Discovery" and noted the precedent of several previous Star Trek series running for seven seasons each. A 10-episode fifth season was officially ordered by Paramount+ in January 2022, with the episode count reduced from previous seasons to align it with the service's other Star Trek series. In March 2023, Paramount announced that the season would be the last for the series. This decision came amid cost cutting for Paramount's streaming content.

Writing 
Kurtzman stated in October 2020 that all seasons after the third would continue to be set in the 32nd century. Co-showrunner Michelle Paradise indicated in August 2021 that writing for the fifth season was yet to begin. The writers were in "full swing" by March 2022, working simultaneously with post-production on the fourth season, and some scripts had been written for the fifth season by the time the fourth season finale was released on March 17. Paradise was working on the script for the season finale by late August 2022, and completed it on September 12.

Executive producer and producing director Olatunde Osunsanmi said the fifth season would take more inspiration for its themes and storytelling approach from Star Trek: The Original Series and Star Trek: The Next Generation than the previous seasons did, and would feature "more exploration and more adventure". The season's story follows the USS Discovery on a galactic adventure to find a mysterious power that has been hidden for centuries and which other dangerous groups are also searching for.

Casting
The season stars the returning Sonequa Martin-Green as Michael Burnham, Doug Jones as Saru, Anthony Rapp as Paul Stamets, Mary Wiseman as Sylvia Tilly, Wilson Cruz as Hugh Culber, Blu del Barrio as Adira Tal, and David Ajala as Cleveland "Book" Booker. They are joined by Callum Keith Rennie as Rayner, a war-time Starfleet captain struggling to adjust to peace. Rennie's casting was announced in October 2022, alongside recurring guests Eve Harlow and Elias Toufexis as outlaw couple Moll and L'ak. Also returning from earlier seasons are Oded Fehr as Charles Vance, Chelah Horsdal as Laira Rillak, Tara Rosling as T'Rina, David Cronenberg as Kovich, and Tig Notaro as Jett Reno.

Filming 
The series is filmed at Pinewood Toronto Studios in Toronto, Canada. Pre-production on the season began by March 2022. Osunsanmi said the season would continue to use the video wall that was built for virtual production on the fourth season, and the crew would take advantage of lessons learned about the technology the first time they used it. Filming for the fifth season began on June 13, 2022, and wrapped on November 20. By March 2023, additional filming was planned to update the season's ending so it could better conclude the series.

Marketing 
To celebrate "Star Trek Day" on September 8, 2022, a video of Cruz giving a set tour during the filming of the season's fourth episode was released. The season was promoted during the "Star Trek Universe" panel at New York Comic-Con in October, with Rapp and Cruz discussing the season alongside executive producers Kurtzman, Paradise, and Rod Roddenberry. Martin-Green joined the panel virtually from set to present a teaser trailer for the season which introduced major new cast members. Justin Carter of Gizmodo said the teaser was short and appeared to be primarily influenced by Indiana Jones. Samantha Coley at Collider said the teaser did not reveal much about the plot but she felt it had a "strong undercurrent of delight" that the fourth season did not. Coley said this could be the most fun season since the inclusion of Christopher Pike in the second season.

With the announcement that the season would be the last for the series, Paramount said there would be events around the world over the next year to celebrate the series.

Release 
The season was originally expected to premiere on Paramount+ in the United States in early 2023, but this was pushed to early 2024 when the season was revealed to be the last for the series.

References

External links 
 
 

5
Fiction set in the 4th millennium
Television series set in the future
Upcoming television seasons